Ashtabula County is the northeasternmost county in the U.S. state of Ohio. As of the 2020 census, the population was 97,574. The county seat is Jefferson, while its largest city is Ashtabula. The county was created in 1808 and later organized in 1811. The name Ashtabula derives from the Lenape language phrase ashte-pihële, which translates to 'always enough (fish) to go around, to be given away' and is a contraction of apchi ('always') + tepi ('enough') + hële (verb of motion). Ashtabula County comprises the Ashtabula, OH Micropolitan Statistical Area, which is also included in the Cleveland–Akron–Canton, OH Combined Statistical Area.

The county is best known for having nineteen covered bridges within the county limits, including both the longest and the shortest covered bridges in the United States. Grapes are a popular crop and there are several award-winning wineries in the region due to the favorable microclimate from the nearby lake. During the winter, Ashtabula County (along with neighboring Geauga and Lake Counties, as well as Crawford and Erie Counties in neighboring Pennsylvania) receives frequent lake-effect snow and is part of the Southeastern Lake Erie Snowbelt.

History

At the time of contact, Ashtabula County appears to have been divided between the Erie people in the east and the Whittlesey culture in the west. The Erie were an Iroquoian people, who were organized like the Iroquois, believed in a similar religion and lived in longhouses in palisaded villages and may have had a burial ground at what is now Erie, PA, whereas the uncontacted Whittlesey are mostly believed to have been Algonquians, who also lived in longhouses at the time of contact (after having gone through prior periods of living in wigwams and Fort Ancient style houses) in villages surrounded by earthen berm walls and had smaller, local burial grounds near each settlement. The French were the first to explore the Great Lakes by ship and, having never met the inhabitants, saw the continuation of longhouses and mistakenly assumed the entire region had belonged to the Erie. Both tribes were likely eradicated by the Iroquois Confederacy during the Beaver Wars (approx. 1630-1701), which later bled into the first of the myriad conflicts collectively called the French-Indian Wars, probably specifically some time during the 1650s. The Jesuit Relations claim rumors of infighting between the Erie and an unknown nation to the west of them who were similar to other Algonquian peoples the French had already encountered in the years prior to both tribes' eradication. Three known village sites have been documented by archaeologists from this period in Windsor  (located inside what is now a private children's Summer Camp) and two at Conneaut. Following the Beaver Wars, and the first conflict of the French-Indian Wars coming to an end in 1701, an official border between England and France was established at what is now the Ohio-PA border, leading to English forts being erected all along the Pennsylvania side that became crucial in the later conflicts of the French-Indian Wars over the next 50 years.

After Europeans arrived in the Americas, the land that became Ashtabula County was originally part of the French colony of Illinois Country, which was ceded in 1764 to Great Britain, along with the rest of Canada (New France) and incorporated into the Province of Quebec, though generally came to be referred to as Ohio Country. The Iroquois placed a vassal tribe of mostly captured Hurons in the region, who later broke free of their control when the French pushed Iroquois and English influence from the area in the 1690s. This group, known as the Wyandot, later ceded settlement of most of the territory roughly between what is now Cleveland, Akron, East Liverpool and the Ohio-PA border to be a common hunting ground, shared by themselves, the Seneca, Shawnee, Lenape and even the Ottawa, or Mississauga, who lived at the western end of Lake Erie, at the time. The Ottawa were the only residents, who maintained two known hunting camps in Ashtabula County- one at Conneaut, and the other at Andover. After the end of the Northwest Indian War, (a conflict which erupted shortly after the American Revolution between the fledgling United States and all the remaining tribes of the Great Lakes region in territory the US claimed) in the 1790s, the Natives were made to turn over ownership of the area to the US via the Treaty of Greenville, and the remaining Ottawa residents were evicted. The area was traversed several times during the period of the French-Indian Wars by the English, including the group led by Major Robert Rodgers, who ultimately convinced Chief Pontiac to switch sides from the French to the English.

In the late 18th century, the land became part of the Connecticut Western Reserve in the Northwest Territory, then was purchased by the Connecticut Land Company in 1795, culminating in the settlement of the first American residents in the region. It was created from Geauga County and a small portion of northern Trumbull County.

During the pre-Civil War period, the entire Western Reserve area of Ohio was anti-slavery, but Ashtabula County was at the center of the resistance. John Brown's eldest son, John Jr., lived in the county for years, and his brother Owen took refuge with him when Virginia was seeking to extradite him for his role in the raid on Harpers Ferry. An armed group of 200 made them safer than anywhere in the U.S., they said, or even Canada. Dangerfield Newby met John Brown in Ashtabula County.

Geography

It is the largest county in Ohio by area.

Adjacent counties
Across Lake Erie lie Elgin and Norfolk Counties, Ontario, Canada (north).
 Erie County, Pennsylvania (northeast)
 Crawford County, Pennsylvania (east)
 Trumbull County (south)
 Geauga County (southwest)
 Lake County (west)

Major highways

Demographics

2000 census
As of the census of 2000, there were 102,728 people, 39,397 households, and 27,774 families residing in the county. The population density was 146 people per square mile (56/km2). There were 43,792 housing units at an average density of 62 per square mile (24/km2). The racial makeup of the county was 94.07% White, 3.16% Black or African American, 0.19% Native American, 0.34% Asian, 0.02% Pacific Islander, 0.85% from other races, and 1.36% from two or more races. 2.23% of the population were Hispanic or Latino of any race. 19.3% were of German, 11.6% Italian, 10.6% English, 10.5% Irish, and 10.3% American ancestry according to Census 2000. 95.2% spoke English, 2.4% Spanish, and 0.8% German as their first language.

There were 39,397 households, out of which 32.40% had children under the age of 18 living with them, 54.80% were married couples living together, 11.40% had a female householder with no husband present, and 29.50% were non-families. 24.80% of all households were made up of individuals, and 10.70% had someone living alone who was 65 years of age or older. The average household size was 2.56 and the average family size was 3.05.

In the county, the population was spread out, with 26.20% under the age of 18, 7.60% from 18 to 24, 28.00% from 25 to 44, 23.60% from 45 to 64, and 14.70% who were 65 years of age or older. The median age was 38 years. For every 100 females there were 95.10 males. For every 100 females age 18 and over, there were 92.10 males.

The median income for a household in the county was $35,607, and the median income for a family was $42,449. Males had a median income of $33,105 versus $22,624 for females. The per capita income for the county was $16,814. About 9.20% of families and 12.10% of the population were below the poverty line, including 17.10% of those under age 18 and 8.60% of those age 65 or over.

2010 census
As of the 2010 United States Census, there were 101,497 people, 39,363 households, and 26,495 families residing in the county. The racial makeup of the county was 92.7% white, 3.5% black or African American, 0.4% Asian, 0.2% American Indian, 1.1% from other races, and 2.1% from two or more races. Those of Hispanic or Latino origin made up 3.4% of the population. In terms of ancestry, 24.9% were German, 15.8% were Irish, 12.6% were English, 11.1% were Italian, 10.0% were American, and 5.8% were Polish.

Of the 39,363 households, 31.3% had children under the age of 18 living with them, 49.2% were married couples living together, 12.4% had a female householder with no husband present, 32.7% were non-families, and 26.9% of all households were made up of individuals. The average household size was 2.50 and the average family size was 3.01. The median age was 41.0 years.

The median income for a household in the county was $42,139 and the median income for a family was $50,227. Males had a median income of $40,879 versus $30,156 for females. The per capita income for the county was $19,898. About 11.8% of families and 15.7% of the population were below the poverty line, including 21.7% of those under age 18 and 9.2% of those age 65 or over.

Politics
According to the accompanying table, Ashtabula County voted for the Democratic candidate for president in every election between 1988 and 2012. Prior to that, however, no fewer than 19 Republican candidates won the county with greater than 61% of the vote. In 2020, incumbent Donald Trump carried the county with 60.8%.

|}

Culture
Ashtabula County (along with neighboring Lake County) fostered a very large Finnish American community around the turn of the twentieth century, and as a result, the area is home to many Finnish Americans.

Ashtabula County has eighteen extant covered bridges. Of these, nine were constructed prior to 1900. See List of Ashtabula County covered bridges.

Communities

Cities
 Ashtabula
 Conneaut
 Geneva

Villages
 Andover
 Geneva-on-the-Lake
 Jefferson (county seat)
 North Kingsville
 Orwell
 Roaming Shores
 Rock Creek

Townships

 Andover
 Ashtabula
 Austinburg
 Cherry Valley
 Colebrook
 Conneaut
 Denmark
 Dorset
 Geneva
 Harpersfield
 Hartsgrove
 Jefferson
 Kingsville
 Lenox
 Monroe
 Morgan
 New Lyme
 Orwell
 Pierpont
 Plymouth
 Richmond
 Rome
 Saybrook
 Sheffield
 Trumbull
 Wayne
 Williamsfield
 Windsor

Census-designated places
 Austinburg
 Edgewood
 Kingsville
 Saybrook-on-the-Lake

Unincorporated communities
 Dorset
 Eagleville
 Footville
 Kelloggsville
 Pierpont
 Unionville
 Williamsfield
 Windsor

Notable people 

 Chester H. Aldrich (1862–1924), governor of Nebraska 1911-1913
 Brian Anderson, Cleveland Indians pitcher, originally from Geneva
 John Brown Junior (1821–1895), son of the abolitionist John Brown, lived in Ashtabula County during the Civil War period, and his brother Owen (1824–1889) took refuge with him..
 Charles Case (1817–1883), born in Austinburg, United States congressman from Indiana
 Tammy Cochran, country music singer from Austinburg; biggest hit was "Angels in Waiting"
 Edwin Cowles (1825–1890), born in Austinburg, publisher of The Cleveland Leader, vice-president of the 1884 Republican National Convention
 Charles DeBarber, a cyber intelligence analyst on CBS's Hunted (2017 TV series)
 Joshua Reed Giddings (1795–1864), member of the U.S. House of Representatives and prominent opponent of slavery
 Rosetta Luce Gilchrist (1850-1921), physician, writer, president of the Ashtabula Equal Rights Club
 Francis Joseph Hall, was an American Protestant Episcopal theologian and author.
 Ken Meyer, head coach of the National Football League's San Francisco 49ers in 1977
 Urban Meyer, head football coach at the University of Florida (2005-2010), head football coach at The Ohio State University (2012-2018), head coach of the National Football League's Jacksonville Jaguars (2021–present)
 James Montgomery, (1814–1871), born in Ashtabula County, colonel in the American Civil War, raided several towns in Missouri and the American South
 Dangerfield Newby (c. 1820–1859), a freed slave who was killed during John Brown's raid on Harpers Ferry.
 Danielle Nicolet, television, film, and voice actress born in Ashtabula
 Larry Obhof, attorney and former President of the Ohio Senate 
 Ransom Eli Olds, pioneer of the American automobile industry, for whom both the Oldsmobile and Reo brands were named
Glenn W. Salisbury, agricultural scientist
 Louis C. Shepard, American Civil War Medal of Honor recipient from Ashtabula County, buried in Lakeview Cemetery, Port Clinton, Ottawa County, Ohio
 Decius Wade, attorney, judge, writer, and politician who has been called the "Father of Montana Jurisprudence" for his role in establishing the common law and statutory law of the U.S. state of Montana
 Clarence Darrow, American lawyer who became famous in the early 20th century for his involvement in the Leopold and Loeb murder trial and the Scopes "Monkey" Trial.
 Connie Schultz, an American writer and journalist and wife of United States Senator Sherrod Brown.
 Doug Tompkins, co-founder of North Face and Esprit
 Danielle Nicolet, Actress

See also
 National Register of Historic Places listings in Ashtabula County, Ohio

References

External links

 Ashtabula County Government's website
 The Ashtabula County District Library

 
Appalachian Ohio
Counties of Appalachia
1811 establishments in Ohio
Populated places established in 1811
Ohio counties in the Western Reserve